Oleg Yevgenyevich Imrekov (10 July 1962 – 26 January 2014) was a Russian professional footballer.

His twin sons Arkadi Imrekov and Viktor Imrekov are professional footballers.

Honours
 Soviet Top League runner-up: 1991.
 USSR Federation Cup winner: 1990.

External links

1962 births
2014 deaths
Sportspeople from Omsk
Soviet footballers
Soviet expatriate footballers
Russian footballers
Soviet Top League players
Russian Premier League players
Russian expatriate footballers
Expatriate footballers in Austria
FC Tyumen players
PFC CSKA Moscow players
FC Rotor Volgograd players
FC Chornomorets Odesa players
FC Spartak Moscow players
LASK players
FC Chernomorets Novorossiysk players
FC Irtysh Omsk players
Association football midfielders